The 1989 Arab Club Champions Cup was played in Morocco in the city of Marrakesh. Wydad Athletic Club won the competition for the first time beating in the final Al-Hilal.

Participants

Preliminary round

Zone 1 (Gulf Area)

Al-Muharraq and Fanja SC advanced to the final tournament.

Zone 2 (Red Sea)
Preliminary round tournament held in Riyadh, Saudi Arabia.

Al-Hilal advanced to the final tournament. Al Ahly withdrew from the final tournament after qualification, it had been replaced by Wydad Casablanca.

Zone 3 (North Africa)
Preliminary round tournament held in Sousse, Tunisia.

JS Tizi Ouzou and Étoile du Sahel advanced to the final tournament.
JS Tizi Ouzou renamed JS Kabylie from the season 1989-90 and played under this name in the final tournament.

Zone 4 (East Region)
Preliminary round tournament held in Baghdad, Iraq. Syria, Jordan and Palestine withdrew their participant.

Al-Tayaran and Al-Ansar SC advanced to the final tournament.

Final Tournament
Final tournament held in Marrakesh, Morocco from 19 November to 2 December 1989.

Group stage

Group A

Group B

Knockout stage

Bracket

Semi-finals

Third place match

Final

Winners

References

External links
7th Arab Club Champions Cup 1989 - rsssf.com

UAFA Club Cup, 1989
UAFA Club Cup, 1989
1989